Jacek Laskowski (born 1 June 1967 in Warsaw) is a Polish sports commentator, working for the TVP.

Events
 UEFA Champions League
 UEFA Europa League
 Poland national football team matches
 FIFA World Cup
 UEFA European Championship

Games
 FIFA (video game series)

See also
 Dariusz Szpakowski

References

1967 births
Living people
Sports commentators
Medical University of Warsaw alumni